Joseph Havel (born 1954) is a postmodernist American sculptor who was born in Minneapolis, Minnesota.  Havel earned a BFA in Studio Arts from the University of Minnesota and an MFA from Pennsylvania State University.  He received a National Endowment for the Arts Artist Fellowship in 1987 and a Louis Comfort Tiffany Artist's Fellowship in 1995.  He lives and works in Houston, Texas and is Director of the Glassell School of Art.

His work is in public collections in the U.S. and abroad including:
 The Museum of Fine Arts Houston
 The Menil Collection, Houston
 The Whitney Museum, New York
 The Dallas Museum of Art
 The Federal Reserve, Dallas
 The Modern Art Museum of Fort Worth
 The Academy of Art, Honolulu
 Laumeier Sculpture Park, St. Louis
 The Centre Pompidou, Paris
 The French Ministry of Culture, Paris
 Portland Museum, Fundacion Rouge, Paris
 Stedelijk Museum voor Actuelle Kunst, Ghent, Belgium

Representation
Joseph Havel is represented in Houston by Hiram Butler Gallery. On February 3, 2-18 the Gallery will Display some of Havel's latest work.
Talley Dunn Gallery in Dallas, Texas http://www.talleydunn.com, and Anthony Meier Fine Arts in San Francisco http://www.anthonymeierfinearts.com

Works
 Exhaling Pearls (1993), Houston, Texas

References
 Colpitt, Frances, Serial Imagery: Helen Altman, The Art Guys, Joseph Havel, James Malone, Michael Miller, John Pomara, Lorraine Tady, John Wilcox, Barry Whistler Gallery, Dallas TX, 1997.
 Dorosenko,  Peter, Joseph Havel, A Decade of Sculpture, London, Scala Publishers, 2006.

External links
 Images of Joseph Havel´s work in Literal
 Joseph Havel in ArtCyclopedia

American sculptors
Modern sculptors
Living people
1954 births